Ambres is a commune in the Tarn department and Occitanie region of southern France.

Geography
The river Dadou flows into the Agout in the commune.

See also
Communes of the Tarn department

References

Communes of Tarn (department)